Bevilo tutto ("Drink it all", "Drink it up") is an Italian drinking song. A version is documented in I Nuovi Goliardi - Periodico mensuale di storia Trieste, in the 1880s. The song was also featured in the movie The Hitman's Bodyguard with Samuel L Jackson singing with some nuns in a bus.

Versions
Apart from the line "Se l'è bevuto tutto, E non gli ha fatto male" (with variant spellings in dialect) the rest of the text has various versions. The version as written in I Nuovi Goliardi Trieste 1881:

Con questo calcione 
si carica la balestra 
e chi ha un bicchier in mano 
al suo compagno il presta 
e mentre che ei berà

noi farem bom, ba, ba, ba 
bom ba ba ba bom ba ba ba ba.

E l'ha beuto tutto 
e non gì' ha fatto male 
chi lo beve allo boccale 
bevilo tutto, bevilo tutto 
che buon prò ti possa fare.

Different versions of the song and different associated drinking games exist. In some versions when the song is sung the drink must be drunk during the first 3 lines since the fourth line is 'he has drunk it!'.

Bevilo tutto,
Bevilo tutto,
Bevilo tutto!
Se l'e' bevuto tutto,
E non gli ha fatto male,
L'acqua gli fa male,
Il vino lo fa cantare!

Recordings
A version of Bevilo tutto was recorded by the organetto players Andrea and Riccardo, I Ragazzi della Quadriglia on the Album of Teramo region folk songs Il giro del mondo.

References

Drinking songs
Italian culture
Italian songs